Hussein Nasser Al-Huraiti was a member of the Kuwaiti National Assembly, representing the first district. Born in 1962, Al-Huraiti worked as a judge, a lawyer, and a professor before being elected to the National Assembly in 2006. Al-Huraiti is an Independent deputy who is on good terms with the Al-Sabah royal family.

Minister of Justice and Islamic Affairs 
Al-Huraiti is also the Minister of Justice and Islamic Affairs, the only elected MP in the cabinet. Kuwaiti law requires the government to include at least one elected lawmaker.

Human Trafficking Law 
On September 30, 2008, Al-Huraiti submitted a new law on human trafficking to the Cabinet. On September 23, the Supreme Committee for Human Rights had held a meeting to adopt effective measures to avoid riots.

Supported Education Minister Nouriya Al-Sabeeh during no-confidence vote 
On January 19, 2008, Al-Huraiti told the Kuwait Times that he had met with Education Minister Nouriya Al-Sabeeh and heard from her replies to a number of questions related to the grilling and he was satisfied with her answers. The lawmaker also said that Sabeeh needed more time to execute her promised reforms. Al-Huraiti had previously been widely expected to back the no-confidence vote. He is one of seven MPs from the Awazem, the largest tribe in the country, whose other six MPs have already declared they would vote against the minister. MP Saad Al-Shurai Al-Azemi, who grilled the minister, belongs to the tribe.

References 

Kuwaiti people of Arab descent
Members of the National Assembly (Kuwait)
Living people
1962 births
Government ministers of Kuwait